Purana Shalla is a village (tehsil) in Gurdaspur in the Indian state of Punjab. It is located on the Gurdaspur-Mukerian highway road which joins Punjab's two districts. This tehsil includes the town of Purana Shalla Adda.

Some of the most notable places in the village include the Gurdwara Tahli Sahib (the Central Gurdwara), Baba Pir-E-Shah Smadh, Amma Satti (Bhagtaneya Di) and Devi temple.

The main religions are Sikhs (95%), Hindus (2%) and Christian (3%). Lubana Sikh and Mehra Sikhs are the major community. Other groups are Jatt, Ramgarhia, Baniya, Laale, and Chamar.

Villages in Gurdaspur district
Bhai Bawa Singh, a classical singer who won the Sharomani Ragi Award, resides in Purana Shalla.